The 1999 Boston Marathon was the 103rd running of the annual marathon race in Boston, United States, which was held on April 19. The elite men's race was won by Kenya's Joseph Chebet in a time of 2:09:52 hours and the women's race was won by Ethiopia's Fatuma Roba in 2:23:25.

Results

Men

Women

References

Results. Association of Road Racing Statisticians. Retrieved 2020-04-13.

External links
 Boston Athletic Association website

Boston Marathon
Boston
Boston Marathon
Marathon
Boston Marathon